William H. Davidson was an American businessman and politician who was the acting Lieutenant Governor of Illinois from December 9, 1836, to December 7, 1838.  Davidson, who had been serving as the senator from White County, Illinois, replaced Alexander M. Jenkins when Jenkins resigned the Lieutenant Governor's office to become president of the Illinois Central Railroad. In 1838, Davidson lost a reelection bid to Stinson H. Anderson.

Death 
Davidson later moved from Carmi, Illinois to Louisville, Kentucky where he ran a successful wholesale mercantile business until his death.

References

Lieutenant Governors of Illinois
People from Carmi, Illinois
Businesspeople from Louisville, Kentucky